Anthony Buttitta (26 July 1907 in Monroe, Louisiana - 11 August 2004 in Sardinia, Italy), the son of wealthy educated parents, recent immigrants from Sicily. He published his first plays and stories in the later 1920s as an undergraduate at Louisiana State Normal College and the University of Texas. Subsequently, at the University of North Carolina, he was one of the group of friends who founded the avant garde Intimate Bookshop and the literary magazine Contempo (1931–34). The magazine led to him meeting and corresponding with such writers as Sherwood Anderson, Ezra Pound, George Bernard Shaw, and William Faulkner. In 1932 he edited a special Contempo issue devoted to Faulkner’s work, now much coveted by Faulkner collectors.

References

Further reading
Encyclopedia of the Harlem Renaissance

1907 births
20th-century American dramatists and playwrights
University of Texas alumni
2004 deaths
American male dramatists and playwrights
20th-century American male writers
American writers of Italian descent
People from Monroe, Louisiana
Northwestern State University alumni
University of North Carolina at Chapel Hill alumni